The 1936 Vermont gubernatorial election took place on November 3, 1936. Incumbent Republican Charles M. Smith did not run for re-election to a second term as Governor of Vermont. Republican candidate George Aiken defeated Democratic candidate Alfred H. Heininger to succeed him.

Republican primary

Results

Democratic primary

Results

General election

Results

References

Vermont
1936
Gubernatorial
November 1936 events